Robert Smith (fl. 1414–1421), of Devizes, Wiltshire, was an English politician.

He was a Member (MP) of the Parliament of England for Devizes in April 1414 and May 1421.

References

14th-century births
15th-century deaths
English MPs April 1414
English MPs May 1421
People from Devizes